Upson may refer to:

 Upson (surname), including a list of people with the name

 Upson County, Georgia
 Upson-Lee High School in Georgia
 Upson, Wisconsin, an unincorporated community